The Kingak Shale is a geologic formation in Alaska. It preserves fossils dating back to the Jurassic period.

See also

 List of fossiliferous stratigraphic units in Alaska
 Paleontology in Alaska

References
 

Jurassic Alaska